C. oliveri may refer to:
 Cinnamomum oliveri, a rainforest tree growing at the eastern coastal parts of Australia
 Commiphora oliveri, a synonym for Commiphora angolensis, a shrub species found in Angola

See also 
 Oliveri (disambiguation)